Tynemouth is a coastal town in the metropolitan borough of North Tyneside, North East England. It is located on the north side of the mouth of the River Tyne, hence its name. It is 8 mi (13 km) east-northeast of Newcastle upon Tyne. It is also home to Tynemouth Priory.

Historically part of Northumberland until 1974, the town was a county borough which included the nearby town of North Shields.

In 2001, the population of the town was recorded at 17,056.

History

 
The headland towering over the mouth of the River Tyne has been settled since the Iron Age. The Romans may have occupied it as a signal station, though it is just north of the Hadrian's Wall frontier (the Roman fort and supply depot of Arbeia stands almost opposite it on the southern headland of the Tyne). In the 7th century a monastery was built in Tynemouth and later fortified. The headland was known as Pen Bal Crag.  The monastery was sacked by the Danes in 800, rebuilt, and destroyed again in 875, but by 1083 it was again operational.

Three kings are reported to have been buried within the monastery: Oswin, King of Deira (651); Osred II, King of Northumbria (792); and, for a time, Malcolm III, King of Scots (1093). Three crowns still adorn the North Tyneside coat of arms. (North Tyneside Council, 1990).

The queens of Edward I and Edward II stayed in the Castle and Priory while their husbands were campaigning in Scotland. King Edward III considered it to be one of the strongest castles in the Northern Marches. After the Battle of Bannockburn in 1314, Edward II fled from Tynemouth by ship.

A village had long been established in the shelter of the fortified Priory, and around 1325 the prior built a port for fishing and trading. This led to a dispute between Tynemouth and the more powerful Newcastle over shipping rights on the Tyne, which continued for centuries. For more history see North Shields.

Prince Rupert of the Rhine landed at Tynemouth in August 1642 on his way to fight in the English Civil War.

Tynemouth was incorporated as a borough in 1849. The first Town Clerk was Thomas Carr Leitch.

Tynemouth was later administered as a county borough with its headquarters at Tynemouth Town Hall in North Shields until 1974.

Tynemouth was listed in the 2018 Sunday Times report on best places to live in Northern England.

Climate
Tynemouth has a very moderated oceanic climate heavily influenced by its position adjacent to the North Sea. Due to its marine influence, winter lows especially are very mild for a Northern English location.

Attractions and amenities

Beaches

In the late 18th century, sea-bathing from Tynemouth's east-facing beaches became fashionable. King Edward's Bay and Tynemouth Longsands are very popular with locals and tourists alike.

Prior's Haven is a small beach within the mouth of the Tyne, sheltered between the Priory and the Spanish Battery, with the pier access on its north side. It was popular with Victorian bathers and is now home to Tynemouth Rowing Club and the local sailing club.

King Edward's Bay (possibly a reference to Edward II) is a small beach on the north side of the Priory, sheltered on three sides by cliffs and reached by stairways or, by the fit and adventurous who understand the weather and tides, over the rocks round the promontories on the north or south sides.

The outdoor pool opened in 1925 and was considered a major tourist attraction in its heyday.

In 2013, Longsands was voted one of the best beaches in the country by users of the world's largest travel site TripAdvisor. TripAdvisor users voted the beach the UK's fourth favourite beach in its 2013 Travellers' Choice Beaches Awards. The beach was also voted the 12th best in Europe.

Front Street

A statue of Queen Victoria by Alfred Turner, unveiled on 25 October 1902, is situated at the edge of the Village Green which is home to the War Memorials for the residents of Tynemouth lost during the Second Boer War of 1899–1902. Designed by A.B. Plummer, it was unveiled on 13 October 1903 by William Brodrick, 8th Viscount Midleton.

The larger central memorial is made of white granite with a cruciform column rising from between four struts in a contemporary design for its time. The front face has a relief sword and wreath carved onto it with the inscription below. The other three faces hold the honour roll for those lost during both World Wars. It was unveiled in 1923. DM O'Herlihy was named as the original designer but a press report stated that a Mr Steele designed the monument and credited O'Herlihy with preparatory works on the village green. The 82 names from World War II were added in 1999.

Kings Priory School

Located on Huntingdon Place, Kings Priory School (formerly The King's School and Priory Primary School) is a co-educational academy with over 800 pupils aged between 4 and 18. Though founded in Jarrow in 1860, the school moved to its present site in Tynemouth in 1865 originally providing a private education for local boys. The school has an Anglican tradition, but admits students of all faiths. Formerly a fee-paying independent school, in 2013 the school merged with the local state Priory Primary School to become a state academy.

Former King's School was named in reference to the three ancient kings buried at Tynemouth Priory: Oswin, Osred and Malcolm III. Its most famous old boy is Stan Laurel, one half of the comedy duo Laurel and Hardy. Hollywood film director Sir Ridley Scott, and racing driver Jason Plato also attended the school.

Tynemouth Pier and lighthouse 

This massive stone breakwater extends from the foot of the Priory some 900 yards (810 metres) out to sea, protecting the northern flank of the mouth of the Tyne. It has a broad walkway on top, popular with Sunday strollers. On the lee side is a lower level rail track, formerly used by trains and cranes during the construction and maintenance of the pier. At the seaward end is a lighthouse.

The pier's construction took over 40 years (1854–1895). In 1898 the original curved design proved inadequate against a great storm and the centre section was destroyed. The pier was then rebuilt in a straighter line and completed in 1909. A companion pier at South Shields protects the southern flank of the river mouth.

A lighthouse had built on the old North Pier (first lit in 1895, it displayed three lights mounted vertically: green over white over red, with a range of ); however, when the pier had to be rebuilt to a new design, an entirely new lighthouse was required. The work was undertaken by Trinity House, beginning in 1903; the lighthouse was finished before the pier itself, and was first lit on 15 January 1908. The revolving optic, manufactured by Barbier, Bénard, et Turenne, displayed a flash three times every ten seconds; it remains in use today. The lighthouse was also equipped with a reed fog signal, powered by compressed air, which was mounted 'on the cupola'; it sounded one long blast every ten seconds. It was manned by four keepers, with two on duty at any one time. In September 1961 a new, more powerful electric light was installed by the Tyne Improvement Commissioners (powered from the mains). Then in 1967 the lighthouse (by then staffed by six keepers on rotation) was automated; a diesel generator was installed along with an electric foghorn.

Before the pier was built, a lighthouse stood within the grounds of Tynemouth Priory and Castle. It was demolished in 1898. It stood on the site of the now-disused Coastguard Station.

The Spanish Battery 

The headland dominates the river mouth and is less well known as Freestone Point. Settlements dating from the Iron Age and later have been discovered here. The promontory supposedly takes its name from Spanish mercenaries who manned guns there in the 16th century to defend Henry VIII's fleet. Most of the guns had been removed by 1905. It is now a popular vantage point for watching shipping traffic on the Tyne.

The Collingwood Monument 

Beyond the Battery, and commanding the attention of all shipping on the Tyne, is the giant memorial to Lord Collingwood, the Collingwood Monument. Collingwood was Nelson's second-in-command at the Battle of Trafalgar, who completed the victory after Nelson was killed in action. Erected in 1845, the monument was designed by John Dobson and the statue was sculpted by John Graham Lough.

The Black Middens 

These rocks in the Tyne near the Monument are covered at high water, and the one rock that can sometimes be seen then is called Priors Stone. Over the centuries they have claimed many ships whose crew "switched off" after safely negotiating the river entrance. In 1864, the Middens claimed five ships in three days with many deaths, even though the wrecks were only a few yards from the shore. In response a meeting was held in North Shields Town Hall in December 1864 at which it was agreed that a body of men should be formed to assist the Coastguard in the event of such disasters.  This led to the foundation of the Tynemouth Volunteer Life Brigade.

Tynemouth Aquarium

Undersea aquatic park, containing seahorses, sharks, giant octopus, frogs, otters and many other creatures. Its Seal Cove  is a purpose-built outdoor facility providing an environment for a captive-bred colony of harbour seals. The  pool includes rocky haul-out areas and underwater caves, specially created to ensure marine mammals are kept in near natural conditions. It was previously known as the Blue Reef Aquarium Tynemouth.

Transport
Maintaining transport links between Tynemouth and Newcastle is Tynemouth Metro station, originally opened in 1882 as a mainline station catering for the thousands of holiday-makers who flocked to the Tynemouth beaches. Its ornate Victorian ironwork canopies have earned it Grade II listed status. They were restored in 2012, and the station now provides a venue for a weekend "flea market", book fairs, craft displays, coffee shops, restaurants, exhibitions and other events.

Demographics
In 2011, Tynemouth had a population of 67,519, compared to 17,056 a decade earlier. This is mainly because of boundary changes rather than an actual population increase: for example, North Shields was a separate urban subdivision in 2001 and had a population of over 36,000. Shiremoor was also a different urban subdivision, with a population of almost 5000 in 2001. The 2011 definition of the town of Tynemouth includes North Shields along with some areas in the north west of the town such as Shiremoor or West Allotment. However using 2011 methodology boundaries Tynemouth had a population of 60,881 in 2001 based on the 2011 boundaries. Thus Tynemouth has become larger in both area and population.

Religion 
Tynemouth's Parish Church is the Church of the Holy Saviour in the Parish of Tynemouth Priory. It was built in 1841 as a chapel of ease to the main Anglican church in the area, Christ Church, North Shields.  In Front Street there were two other churches, the Catholic Parish of Our Lady & St Oswins, opened in 1899, and also Tynemouth Congregational Church, which closed in 1973 and is now a shopping arcade.

Notable residents

Susan Mary Auld – naval architect
Thomas Bewick – engraver, spent many holidays at Bank Top and wrote most of his memoirs there in 1822
Septimus Brutton – played a single first-class cricket match for Hampshire in 1904
Toby Flood – England rugby player, was a pupil at The King's School
Ralph Pake –  professional footballer
Ray Slater - (1931–2005), professional footballer
Andy Taylor – former lead guitarist for the new wave group Duran Duran was born in Tynemouth in 1961 at the Tynemouth Jubilee Infirmary.
John of Tynemouth (canon lawyer) – (died 1221), Canon lawyer, author, teacher at Oxford University later canon and judge.
John of Tynemouth (chronicler) –, vicar of Tynemouth, author of world history and of British hagiography.
John of Tynemouth (geometer) –, author of a book on geometry later relied on by Adelard of Bath and Roger Bacon.  Possibly the same man as the canon lawyer.

Notable visitors

Charles Dickens visited Tynemouth and wrote in a letter from Newcastle, dated 4 March 1867:

'We escaped to Tynemouth for a two hours' sea walk. There was a high wind blowing, and a magnificent sea running. Large vessels were being towed in and out over the stormy bar with prodigious waves breaking on it; and, spanning the restless uproar of the waters, was a quiet rainbow of transcendent beauty. the scene was quite wonderful. We were in the full enjoyment of it when a heavy sea caught us, knocked us over, and in a moment drenched us and filled even our pockets.'

Giuseppe Garibaldi sailed into the mouth of the River Tyne in 1854 and briefly stayed in Huntingdon Place. The house is marked by a commemorative plaque.

Lewis Carroll states in the first surviving diary of his early manhood, that he met 'three nice little children' belonging to a Mrs Crawshay in Tynemouth on 21 August 1855. He remarks: 'I took a great fancy to Florence, the eldest, a child of very sweet manners'.

Algernon Charles Swinburne arrived hot foot from Wallington Hall in December 1862 and proceeded to accompany William Bell Scott and his guests, probably including Dante Gabriel Rossetti on a trip to Tynemouth. Scott writes that as they walked by the sea, Swinburne declaimed his Hymn to Proserpine and Laus Veneris in his strange intonation, while the waves 'were running the whole length of the long level sands towards Cullercoats and sounding like far-off acclamations'.

Peter the Great of Russia is reputed to have stayed briefly in Tynemouth while on an incognito visit to learn about shipbuilding on the Tyne. He was fascinated by shipbuilding and Western life. Standing  and with body-guards, he would not have been troubled by the locals.

Festivals

Mouth of Tyne festival

The Mouth of the Tyne Festival currently continues the local festival tradition. This annual free festival is held jointly between Tynemouth and South Shields and includes a world-class open-air concert at Tynemouth Priory.

Tynemouth pageant
Tynemouth Pageant is a community organisation in North Tyneside, Tyne and Wear, England, devoted to staging an open-air dramatic pageant every three years in the grounds of Tynemouth Castle and Priory, by kind permission of English Heritage who run the historic monastic and defensive site at the mouth of the River Tyne.

Gallery

In popular culture
 
Many of the books of prize-winning children's author Robert Westall are set in Tynemouth.
 The Fire Worm. London: Gollancz, 1988. , a book by prize-winning science fiction author Ian Watson is set in Tynemouth, and is based on the Lambton Worm legend.
The 1980s television series Supergran was predominantly filmed in Tynemouth and the flying bicycle and other artefacts used in filming were until 2006 on display in the Land of Green Ginger (converted Congregational Church) on Front Street.
Many scenes from the 1961 film Payroll are set in Tynemouth.
 Several scenes from the TV series Vera have been shot in and around Tynemouth.
A short Manga comic, written by Japanese animator Hayao Miyazaki, entitled A Trip To Tynemouth was released in 2006.

References

External links

 Tynemouth, in video and pictures (personal website)
 Tynemouth Priory at the English Heritage website
 A guide to Tynemouth market
 Tynemouth shops, bars, cafes and events

 
Towns in Tyne and Wear
Populated coastal places in Tyne and Wear
Seaside resorts in England
Surfing locations in England
Unparished areas in Tyne and Wear
Metropolitan Borough of North Tyneside